This is a list of artists who have achieved one number-one hit on the UK Singles Chart and no other entry on the chart. The list uses the strict The Guinness Book of British Hit Singles definition of "one-hit wonder", a term also commonly used more loosely to refer to any act known primarily for one major hit.

Methodology 
A hit is attributed to the main artist given credit. If a single is released by two artists with the conjunction 'and' or 'versus' then both artists have equal billing (e.g. Yolanda Be Cool & DCUP, who have also been credited as Yolanda Be Cool vs. DCUP) and are both counted as having a number one (in this case "We No Speak Americano") whereas if the conjunction between two artists is 'featuring' or 'with' (or similar) then the first artist is considered the main artist for that hit, with the other artist listed being given a lesser billing (traditionally in these cases they would be additional vocalists or contributing instrumentalists, although in the 21st century it became common for the lead vocalist to be a 'featured' artist, with the main credit only affecting the chart in relation to the three-track rule).

Artists who are classed as one-hit wonders within the past twelve months are not yet added to the list, as they may still follow-up their number one with another hit. A one-hit wonder from earlier who now goes on to score another hit will be removed from this list.

One-hit wonders

Under an alternative name 
 The KLF scored a single hit as The Timelords (the number 1 "Doctorin' the Tardis" in 1988), but scored individual hits as The Justified Ancients of Mu Mu (aka The JAMs) and 2K, and several hits, including another number 1, as The KLF.
 Isaac Hayes reached number 1 as Chef with "Chocolate Salty Balls (P.S. I Love You)" in 1998. Hayes had hits under his own name during the 1970s, with "Chocolate Salty Balls" listed under his discography in the hit singles books and online, as part of the Official Charts Company database. Comedy Central's South Park team followed up "Chocolate Salty Balls" with another British Top 10 hit, this time for character Mr. Hankey, in the Christmas chart of 1999.

Band members charting as a one-hit solo act 
 Steve 'Silk' Hurley on 24 January 1987 had his only UK solo chart entry "Jack Your Body" which went to number 1.  The well-known producer had scored many hits on the UK Dance Chart and was a member of JM Silk (who have had other chart entries). Hurley refused to promote himself as a solo artist and went on to remix many more chart hits.
 Yanou has been responsible for two number one hits in the UK singles chart, "Heaven" and "Evacuate the Dancefloor". Whereas the latter song was one of his numerous hits with his Eurodance group Cascada, the former track (a dance cover of a 1980s Bryan Adams song) was the only time Yanou's name appeared in the UK Top 75 under the guise of a solo act. "Heaven" was actually a collaboration with DJ Sammy and singer Dominique Van Hulst (Do), with the record credited to DJ Sammy & Yanou featuring Do. Even though DJ Sammy charted again in the UK Top 10 with a few more dance music covers, "Heaven" was the only time Van Hulst reached the UK Singles chart.

One hit wonders excluding collaboration work 
This features artists who went to number one on their own with their only solo hit, however their only additional chart entries were with other artists.

 John Denver on his own had only a single UK chart entry, with "Annie's Song" which reached number one in 1974.  He also collaborated with Plácido Domingo on another single, 1981's "Perhaps Love" which reached number 46 and was his only other chart entry. Denver also had five Top 20 albums on the UK Albums Chart during the 1970s. His lack of singles chart success in the United Kingdom stands in contrast to his popularity in his native United States, where he charted 15 Top 40 entries, including four number one singles.
  Robin Beck reached number one on 19 November 1988 with her song "First Time". The song became a success after its use as a jingle by Coca-Cola. and was followed by Beck's cover of Bonnie Tyler's "Save Up All Your Tears", which narrowly missed out on chart inclusion by peaking at number 84. In 2006, Swedish dance outfit Sunblock, along with Robin Beck, recorded a cover, which peaked at number 9 in the UK. According to the Official Charts Company (OCC). records, in the pre-digital age, with re-recorded vocals (for example, live versions) or remixes released with substantially different catalogue numbers were seen as new hits (see "Blue Monday" as an example). The Sunblock record gives Robin Beck two Top 40 hits to her name and so Beck is not seen as a one-hit wonder in the eyes of the OCC.

Comic Relief singles
for more information on Red Nose Day, see the main Comic Relief page.

 Comic Relief presents Cliff Richard and The Young Ones featuring Hank Marvin

The first Comic Relief record to reach number one in the UK singles chart was "Living Doll" in 1986. The song was a version of Cliff Richard and The Shadows' 1959 number one hit "Living Doll", recorded when the band were called The Drifters. Cliff Richard, The Shadows and band member Hank B. Marvin have had many hits in their own rights, including numerous number ones, while The Young Ones cast members Rik Mayall, Adrian Edmondson and Nigel Planer have made other chart appearances as part of their spoof band Bad News (with Peter Richardson). In addition to these hits, Planer also had a number two hit as his Young Ones character 'Neil' in 1984, whilst Mayall's football song "Noble England" charted in the UK Top 10 as a tribute by fans after his death. Actor Christopher Ryan was the only member of The Young Ones (featured on the record) who did not feature on any other chart entries, whilst missing cast member Alexei Sayle had a hit two years earlier with "'Ullo John! Gotta New Motor?". Even though Gallup did not credit Comic Relief's involvement on this record, the follow-up ("Rockin' Around the Christmas Tree") has gone into the Official Chart Company's database as being by Comic Relief Presents Mel & Kim Performed By Kim Wilde & Mel Smith.

 Comic Relief - Hale & Pace and the Stonkers/Victoria Wood

In 1991, Gareth Hale and Norman Pace were a comedy double-act known at the time for starring in their own sketch comedy series on ITV. "The Stonk", a charity single for Comic Relief, was produced by Queen guitarist Brian May, who also performed on the song, had his name printed on the front cover and was part of the charity supergroup on the record called the Stonkers. "The Stonk", was based on a fictitious dance craze and was co-written by the two comedians along with Joe Griffiths. Other musicians performing on the single, besides Brian May playing keyboards and guitar, were David Gilmour and Tony Iommi on guitar, with Neil Murray on bass guitar. Cozy Powell, Roger Taylor and Rowan Atkinson – appearing as his character Mr. Bean – performed on drums. Joe Griffiths and Mike Moran contributed on keyboard. Hale & Pace never released another single, while Rowan Atkinson was featured on the follow-up single "(I Wanna Be) Elected", credited to Mr Bean and Smear Campaign ft Bruce Dickinson, another top ten hit for Comic Relief.

A UK number-one single for one week on 23 March 1991, "The Stonk" was the UK's 22nd-best-selling single of the year. "The Stonk" was released as a joint-single with a track written and performed by the comedian Victoria Wood. Entitled "The Smile Song", the song was credited on the front of the single cover and listed as track 2 on the seven-inch and CD single (rather than B-side). However, the UK singles chart compilers (now the Official Charts Company) did not credit her with having number one hit, in a situation similar to the fate of BAD II's "Rush", the AA-side of preceding number one, "Should I Stay or Should I Go" by The Clash.  Rival chart compilers MRIB did, however, credit "The Smile Song" as a double A-sided number one on the Network Chart.

 Gareth Gates with special guests The Kumars 

"Spirit in the Sky" is a song sometimes credited as a 'three-time one-hit wonder' as it was also a number one hit for Norman Greenbaum as well as Doctor and the Medics, a band who are not actually a one-hit wonder as they also had a hit with "Burn" in 1986 and charted with a cover of ABBA's "Waterloo" with Roy Wood. Even though Gareth Gates is an artist with four number ones, including his first three releases, The Kumars (comedians Sanjeev Bhaskar, Meera Syal, Indira Joshi and Vincent Ebrahim from the chat show of the same name) have never charted again.

 Vanessa Jenkins and Bryn West featuring Sir Tom Jones and Robin Gibb

"(Barry) Islands in the Stream" was a version of a Bee Gees song originally recorded by Kenny Rogers and Dolly Parton, and a single which topped the UK chart on 15 March 2009.  
It was recorded by Welsh actor-comedians Ruth Jones and Rob Brydon as characters from the hit BBC sitcom Gavin & Stacey, a show where they were originally seen singing the song. The single was recorded for Red Nose Day 2009 with the duo being joined by Welsh singer Sir Tom Jones and Bee Gee Robin Gibb.

Special cases - Football records
Please note that some chart books will group records by one team under one entry even though the squad will have changed over the decades.

 ENGLANDneworder
An ensemble group consisting of electropop group New Order and the England national football team and their 1990 FIFA World Cup campaign. The song, "World In Motion", spent two weeks at number one, with ENGLANDneworder being used by graphic designer Peter Saville on the single sleeve. The England national football team is listed under four different England World Cup Squad recording acts by the OCC with "Back Home" being a number one hit for the team in 1970. while members of New Order have charted as part of Electronic, Joy Division, Monaco and the Other Two. "World In Motion" was the only number one hit on the UK Singles Chart for New Order, with the Manchester band having the sole credit for the record since 2002. "World In Motion" was co-written by Fat Les' Keith Allen and features a rap from John Barnes, who was part of Liverpool FC when they had a Top 10 hit with the "Anfield Rap".

 Manchester United Football Squad
In a way similar to England national team, Manchester United have charted before with different squads and with slight amendments to their football team brand, as listed on the Official Charts database. "Come on You Reds" was a Number One song recorded by the 1994 Manchester United football squad, featuring an uncredited Status Quo (who also wrote and produced the record) with the song spending 15 weeks on the UK charts.

 Baddiel & Skinner & Lightning Seeds 
Like Robin Beck, this act have a Number 1 song which has charted again as a new hit with re-recorded versions and like ELV1S vs JXL  a song which has been classed as a hit more than once by The Virgin Book of British Hit Singles. Originally a number one under the title "Three Lions" (Epic 6632732) in 1996, it was re-recorded with updated lyrics in 1998 as "3 Lions '98" (Epic 6660982), when it reached number one again. The 1998 version was then re-issued as "3 Lions" in 2002 (Epic 6728152) with a DualDisc version coming out in 2006 (Sony BMG 82876856672) effectively making the record a double-A side (a fact reflected in Sony's 2021 re-issue under the title "3 Lions: Football's Coming Home - 25th Anniversary Edition"). Since the chart rules were updated to reflect streaming, both versions have been combined under the title "3 Lions" regardless if people stream the original "Three Lions" or the 1998 version (with any additional chart weeks put under a listing for "3 Lions" on the Official Charts site even though the record was listed as "Three Lions" in 1996). In addition to these four "3 Lions" hits, David Baddiel, Frank Skinner and Ian Broudie (the Lightning Seeds) re-recorded the song again in 2010, this time with Robbie Williams, Trevor Horn and Russell Brand. Instead of listing all of their names on the front cover, this re-recording was credited to the Squad. and is known as "3 Lions 2010" or "Three L10ns". This song peaked at number 21 on the UK singles chart and gave Baddiel and Skinner five hits out of one song (compared to two Top 40 hits for Robin Beck's "First Time").

Aggregate ensemble groups 
The following is a list of aggregate ensemble groups. These are usually put together for charity purposes. The ones listed below are one-hit wonders in their respective line-ups, but most are primarily made up of several chart artists. The following line-ups have all reached number one in their only hit under these umbrella group names:

 USA for Africa ("We Are the World", 1985)
 The Crowd ("You'll Never Walk Alone", 1985)
 Ferry Aid ("Let It Be", 1987)
 Dunblane ("Knocking on Heaven's Door"/"Throw These Guns Away", 1996) (this was a double-A side with a cover version of Bob Dylan on one side (with additional lyrics), and an original co-written by Bannockburn member Ted Christopher on the other) 
 Various Artists ("Perfect Day", 1997)
 Helping Haiti ("Everybody Hurts", 2010)
 Shout for England featuring Dizzee Rascal and James Corden ("Shout", 2010) (currently listed in the Official Chart Company's archive as "Shout" by Shout featuring Dizzee and James Corden)
 Artists for Grenfell ("Bridge over Troubled Water", 2017)
 Live Lounge Allstars ("Times Like These (BBC Radio 1 Stay Home)", 2020)

Note: there have been a few collaborations and multi-artist EPs which have charted under the name 'Various Artists', none of which match the one singing "Perfect Day" as listed above, which is why this record is eligible for inclusion on this list. (Note: In 2000, there was another version of "Perfect Day" released for BBC Music Live which charted at number 69 in the chart, while records like "Thank ABBA for the Music" are currently listed under the 'Various Artists' tab at officialcharts.com and not under each artist's discography as in the case of the later chart books by HiT Entertainment/Virgin Books.)

Aggregate ensemble groups: charity records - special cases 
 Band Aid

Currently the Official Charts Company (OCC) lists the four versions of "Do They Know it's Christmas?" separately on their website under entries for Band Aid (1984), Band Aid 20 (2004), Band Aid 30 (2014) and Band Aid II (1989). However they were combined under the main Band Aid entry in various British Hit Singles books, giving the act an achievement of its first four records at number one.

 The X Factor finalists

Currently the Official Charts Company lists each year's charity record by The X Factor finalists under a separate recording act entry as the contestants in the ITV show The X Factor were different every year, meaning that the group of finalists were different each year as well. However, various British Hit Singles books combined the four number ones (for "Hero", 2008; "You Are Not Alone", 2009; "Heroes", 2010 and "Wishing on a Star", 2011)
under one X Factor Finalists entry, also giving the act an achievement of its first four records at number one.

 The Justice Collective

In 2012, The Justice Collective reached number one with a cover of "He Ain't Heavy, He's My Brother". This single was one of a number of campaigning charity record projects put together by Peter Hooton of The Farm, with the others being a number 14 UK hit single called "The Fields of Anfield Road" credited to the Liverpool Collective featuring the Kop Choir (a record which also reached number one in Scotland on 26 April 2009, because the Scottish chart at that time only reflected sales in the declining physical formats and did not include the then-growing download market), and a version of the Farm's "All Together Now", credited to The Peace Collective, which peaked at number 70 in 2014.

 Lewisham and Greenwich NHS Choir

In 2015, the Lewisham and Greenwich NHS Choir had the UK Singles Chart Christmas number one, beating Justin Bieber to the top of this chart with their charity release "A Bridge over You". Five years later they recorded a version of Bieber's song "Holy" with him. However, when the record was released in December 2020 it was credited as a remix with the Official Charts Company combining it with the original entry, with no additional Lewisham and Greenwich NHS Choir credit. In May 2021, the Lewisham and Greenwich NHS Choir were featured on a charity version of "Anywhere Away From Here" by Rag ‘n’ Bone Man and P!nk, which was performed by all three acts at the 2021 BRIT Awards, and helped the record reach the top ten. As in the case of "Holy", the new version of "Anywhere Away From Here" was combined with the already charting original by the Official Charts Company, with no additional credit for the choir. In addition to these records, a single was released by NHS Voices in 2018 with the record company credit going to the Lewisham and Greenwich NHS Choir. This single was a charity version of the Beatles' "With a Little Help from My Friends" reached only number 89 and stayed just 1 week in the UK Top 100.

 Michael Ball, Captain Tom Moore and the Voices of Care Choir

Captain Sir Tom Moore was a 99-year-old war veteran who raised millions of pounds for the NHS during the COVID-19 pandemic by walking 100 laps of his garden before his 100th birthday. Singer and BBC Radio 2 presenter Michael Ball decided that he would try and make Captain Tom Moore the oldest artist to have a number one hit in the UK by recording a fundraising cover of the Rodgers and Hammerstein song "You'll Never Walk Alone" with the intention that the song would be at number one in the Official Singles Chart at the point Captain Moore turned 100. The duo teamed up with the NHS Voices of Care Choir with the song, credited to Michael Ball, Captain Tom Moore and the Voices of Care Choir, reaching the top spot on the chart dated 30 April 2020. Even though Ball has had hits in the singles and albums chart (including three number one albums with Alfie Boe), Moore died on the 2nd February 2021, with one hit single and the record for the oldest artist to have a chart topper to his name, while the Voices of Care Choir were the second NHS associated choir to get a number one hit, after the Lewisham and Greenwich NHS Choir.  In addition to these records, a charity version of the Beatles' "With a Little Help from My Friends" was released in 2018 credited to NHS Voices. Even though the record only reached number 89 in the UK charts and stayed just 1 week in the UK Top 100, it is likely that many of the choir members appeared on Captain Tom Moore's record and on "A Bridge over You".

Featured artists
Acts charting in the days of The Guinness Book of British Hit Singles with the conjunction 'and' or 'versus' were seen as a separate recording act when they had amassed a number of hits together, with acts seen as a footnote if they had been featured on a record. However, by the time of the Hit Entertainment and Virgin chart books (and also reflected in the information held by the Official Charts site) featured artists had been given equal status as the main recording act (so that Ed Sheeran has 10 number ones with "River" by Eminem being part of that total, and Sheeran's discography being responsible for number ones by Stormzy and Khalid where they feature as guest acts), with any hits added to the featured artists discography if they had already had been a lead artist or had amassed enough hits as a featured artist to be listed separately. Listed below is a table of acts whose only singles chart appearance has been as a featured artist on a number one hit.

Notes

See also 
 One-hit wonder
 Lists of one-hit wonders
 List of one-hit wonders on the UK Albums Chart
 List of one-hit wonders on the UK Singles Downloads Chart
 Lists of UK Singles Chart number ones
 List of UK Singles Chart Christmas number ones
 List of songs which have spent the most weeks on the UK Singles Chart

References

External links 
 Roberts, David (2006). British Hit Singles & Albums, 19th, London: Guinness World Records Limited, p.  540. .
 The Official Charts website

British popular music
One hit wonders
UK Singles